Sleepless Nights is the fifteenth album by American country music artist Patty Loveless. The album was released on September 9, 2008 (see 2008 in country music). Her first album for the Saguaro Road Records label, it is also her first studio album since Dreamin' My Dreams in 2005. Sleepless Nights comprises cover versions of traditional classic country music songs. "Why Baby Why", a song originally recorded by George Jones which has also been a chart hit for several other artists, was released in September 2008 as the first single from the album.

Critical reception

Allmusic critic Thom Jurek gave Sleepless Nights a four-star rating out of five, saying "Loveless takes each of these cuts deep into the well of her heart and let's them rip." Jurek also said that Emory Gordy, Jr., Loveless' husband and producer, "showers [the songs] in emotion and Loveless simply needs to open her mouth to tell the story behind the words to get it across to the listener, where it resonates deeply."

Matt C., a critic for Engine 145, also gave the album a four-out-of-five rating. He described Sleepless Nights as "a thoroughly arresting listening experience, as Loveless lays twenty-first century gloss, if not sensibilities, on a few songs that haven’t been dusted off in quite some time." Although he criticized the album's lack of up-tempo songs and felt that some of the covers were "uncomfortable", he nonetheless commended Loveless for "find[ing] her wheelhouse on songs that are no-less classic but nonetheless haven’t achieved corner bar ubiquity", also saying "The success of these songs is equal testament to Loveless’ outstanding country voice and the timeless quality of the material she’s selected."

Slant Magazine critic Jonathan Keefe also criticized the album for its lack up-tempo material, but gave it four-and-a-half stars out of five, saying "Loveless has offered another unqualified masterpiece with Sleepless Nights and reasserted her place as one of the premier artists not just of the country genre but of contemporary popular music."

Sleepless Nights received a nomination for Best Country Album at the 51st Annual Grammy Awards.

Track listing
Source:

.* Bonus Track, only available via download

Personnel

Harold Bradley – bass guitar, tic tac bass, archtop guitar
Pete Finney – steel guitar
Vince Gill – background vocals
Emory Gordy, Jr. – bass guitar, acoustic guitar
Steve Gibson – electric guitar
John Hobbs – piano
Jedd Hughes – background vocals
Virgil Lee – background vocals
Jim Iler – background vocals

Billy Linneman – upright bass
Patty Loveless – lead vocals
Al Perkins – steel guitar
Sydnie Perry – background vocals
Carmella Ramsey – background vocals
Deanie Richardson – fiddle, mandolin
Hargus "Pig" Robbins – piano
Harry Stinson – drums, background vocals
Guthrie Trapp – electric guitar
Biff Watson – acoustic guitar, electric guitar, archtop guitar

Chart performance

References

External links
 

2008 albums
Patty Loveless albums
Albums produced by Emory Gordy Jr.
Covers albums